The 2021 Las Vegas Challenger was a professional tennis tournament played on hard courts. It was the sixth edition of the revamped tournament which was the part of the 2021 ATP Challenger Tour. It took place in Las Vegas, United States between 25 and 31 October 2021.

Singles main draw entrants

Seeds

 1 Rankings are as of October 18, 2021.

Other entrants
The following players received wildcards into the singles main draw:
  Christopher Bulus
  Aleksandar Kovacevic
  Jordan Sauer

The following player received entry into the singles main draw as an alternate:
  Stefan Kozlov

The following players received entry from the qualifying draw:
  Dayne Kelly
  Shintaro Mochizuki
  Mukund Sasikumar
  Donald Young

The following players received entry as lucky losers:
  Nick Chappell
  Aidan McHugh

Champions

Singles

  J. J. Wolf def.  Stefan Kozlov 6–4, 6–4.

Doubles

  William Blumberg /  Max Schnur def.  Jason Jung /  Evan King 7–5, 6–7(5–7), [10–5].

References

Las Vegas Challenger
Tennis in Las Vegas
2021 in American tennis
October 2021 sports events in the United States
2021
2021 in sports in Nevada